Daniil Borisovich Shishkaryov (born 6 July 1988) is a Russian handball player for HBC CSKA Moscow and the Russian national team.

References

External links

1988 births
Living people
Russian male handball players
People from Kostanay
RK Vardar players
Expatriate handball players
Russian expatriate sportspeople in North Macedonia